Carlos Westendorp y Cabeza (born 7 January 1937) is a Spanish diplomat and former politician. He is the former Minister of Foreign Affairs and also served as High Representative for Bosnia and Herzegovina succeeding Carl Bildt and was powered with upholding the Dayton Peace Agreement.

Career
Born in Madrid on 7 January 1937, Westendorp joined the Spanish Diplomatic Service in 1966. Following several assignments abroad (from 1966 to 1969: Deputy Consul General in São Paulo, Brazil; from 1975 to 1979: Commercial and Economic Counselor at the Spanish Embassy in the Hague, the Netherlands) and in Spain (1969–1975: Head of Economic Studies at the Diplomatic School; Director of Technological Agreements in the Ministry of Foreign Affairs; Chief of Cabinet of the Minister of Industry) he dedicated a great part of his professional career to the process of integration of Spain into the European Communities.

Between 1979 and 1985 at the Ministry of European Affairs, he successively served as Adviser to the Minister, as Head of the Minister’s Private Office and as Secretary General, presiding over the technical team in charge of the accession negotiations. In 1986, when Spain joined the European Communities, he was appointed its first Ambassador Permanent Representative. He chaired the Committee of Permanent Representatives (COREPER) during the first Spanish Presidency of the EEC in 1989.

From 1991 to 1995 he was Spain’s Secretary of State for the European Union. He was centrally involved in the Spanish Presidency of the EU in 1995, which coincided with the adoption of the Euro, the launching of the Barcelona process and the signing of the transatlantic agenda. In this last capacity, he chaired the Reflection group set up to prepare the negotiations on treaty change which led to the Treaties of Amsterdam and subsequently, Nice.

In December 1995, he was appointed Minister of Foreign Affairs and served in that capacity until the end of the last government presided by Felipe González. In May 1996 he was appointed Ambassador Permanent Representative of Spain to the United Nations in New York.

From 1997 to 1999 he served as the 2nd High Representative for Bosnia and Herzegovina. Under the so called "Bonn Powers" his role gave him the authority to take the necessary decisions to implement the Dayton Agreement. His first act with these new powers was laws on citizenship, and later imposed a new flag and national anthem. He was involved in removing Nikola Poplašen from power despite Poplašen being elected president.

In 1999 he was elected Member of the European Parliament representing the PSOE. He served as Chairman of the Parliament’s Committee on Industry, Trade, Energy and Research until 2003. In 2003 he was elected Member of the Madrid Regional Assembly and Speaker on Economy of the Socialist Group.

He was co-founder and Executive Vice-President of the Toledo Center for Peace and is now member of its board. After the elections of 2004 he was appointed Ambassador to the United States of America, a position he occupied until 2008. In April 2010, he was appointed Secretary-General of the Club de Madrid.

He is currently principal advisor to Felipe González, Chairman of the Reflection Group established by the EU Heads of State and Government to assist the European Union to anticipate and meet the challenges facing in the period 2020 to 2030.

He is President of Westendorp International S.L., a private consulting company. He has addressed conferences and lectures and has written articles and books mostly on European Affairs, for which he was awarded the Salvador de Madariaga Prize of Journalism. He has been awarded various Spanish and foreign decorations, including the Great Cross of the Order of Charles III and Officier de la Légion d’Honneur.

References

External links 

|-

1937 births
Living people
People from Madrid
Spanish diplomats
Foreign ministers of Spain
Permanent Representatives of Spain to the United Nations
Ambassadors of Spain to the United States
High Representatives for Bosnia and Herzegovina
Flag designers
Members of the 6th Assembly of Madrid
Members of the 7th Assembly of Madrid
Spanish officials of the European Union
MEPs for Spain 1999–2004
Members of the Socialist Parliamentary Group (Assembly of Madrid)
Secretaries of State for the European Union
Spanish people of German descent